James Mathews Griggs (March 29, 1861 – January 5, 1910) was a U.S. Representative from Georgia.

Born in Lagrange, Georgia, Griggs attended the common schools and was graduated from the Peabody Normal College, Nashville, Tennessee, in 1881.
He taught school and studied law.
He was admitted to the bar in 1883 and commenced the practice of law in Alapaha, Georgia.
He engaged in the newspaper business.
He moved to Dawson, Georgia, in 1885.

Griggs was elected by the legislature solicitor general of the Pataula judicial circuit in 1888.
He was reelected in 1892 and served until his resignation in 1893 to accept appointment by the Governor as judge of the Pataula judicial circuit.

Griggs was elected to the same office by the legislature.
He was reelected and served until his resignation in 1896 to accept the Democratic nomination for Congress.
He served as delegate to the Democratic National Convention in 1892.
He served as chairman of the Democratic Congressional Campaign Committee in 1904–1908.

Griggs was elected as a Democrat to the Fifty-fifth and to the six succeeding Congresses and served from March 4, 1897, until his death in Dawson, Georgia, January 5, 1910.
He was interred in Cedar Hill Cemetery.

See also
List of United States Congress members who died in office (1900–49)

References

James M. Griggs, late a representative from Georgia, Memorial addresses delivered in the House of Representatives and Senate frontispiece 1911

External links
 

1861 births
1910 deaths
People from LaGrange, Georgia
People from Dawson, Georgia
Georgia (U.S. state) state court judges
Democratic Party members of the United States House of Representatives from Georgia (U.S. state)
People from Berrien County, Georgia
19th-century American politicians
19th-century American judges